The following is a list of events affecting Canadian television in 2013. Events listed include television show debuts, finales, cancellations, and channel launches, closures and rebrandings.

Events

January

February

March

April

May

June

July

August

September

October

November

December

Television programs

Programs debuting in 2013
Series currently listed here have been announced by their respective networks as scheduled to premiere in 2013. Note that shows may be delayed or cancelled by the network between now and their scheduled air dates.

Made-for-TV movies and miniseries

Programs ending in 2013

Changes of network affiliation

Television stations

Station launches

Network affiliation changes

Deaths

See also
 2013 in Canada
 List of Canadian films of 2013

References